is a city located in Niigata Prefecture, Japan. , the city had an estimated population of 35,027 in 13,289 households, and a population density of 37 persons per km2. The city is famous for its koshihikari rice, which commands a premium in the Japanese market.

Geography
Uonuma is located in an inland region of south-central Niigata Prefecture, bordered by Fukushima Prefecture to the east and Gunma Prefecture to the south. Parts of the city are within the borders of Oze National Park or the Echigo Sanzan-Tadami Quasi-National Park

Surrounding municipalities
Niigata Prefecture
Sanjō
Nagaoka
Ojiya
Tōkamachi
Minamiuonuma
Gunma Prefecture
Minakami
Katashina
Fukushima Prefecture
Tadami
Hinoemata

Climate
Uonuma has a Humid climate (Köppen Cfa) characterized by warm, wet summers and cold winters with heavy snowfall.  The average annual temperature in Uonuma is 12.6 °C. The average annual rainfall is 2049 mm with September as the wettest month. The temperatures are highest on average in August, at around 25.0 °C, and lowest in January, at around 0.4 °C.

Demographics
Per Japanese census data, the population of Uonuma has declined  over the past 50 years.

History
The area of present-day Uonuma was part of ancient Echigo Province, with the name of Uonuma appearing in the Shoku Nihongi in an entry dated 702 AD. During the Edo period, the area was largely tenryō territory administered directly by the Tokugawa shogunate or part of the holdings of Aizu Domain. The area was greatly affected by the Tenpō famine of 1835–1837. After the Meiji restoration, the area was organised as part of Kitauonuma District, Niigata with the creation of the modern municipalities system. The modern city of Uonuma was established on November 1, 2004, from the merger of the towns of Horinouchi and Koide, and the villages of Hirokami, Irihirose, Sumon and Yunotani (all from Kitauonuma District).

Government

Uonuma has a mayor-council form of government with a directly elected mayor and a unicameral city legislature of 20 members.

Economy
The economy of Uonuma is dominated by agriculture, predominantly rice production, along with sake brewing.

Education
Uonuma has nine public elementary schools and six public middle schools operated by the city government. The city has two public high schools operated by the Niigata Prefectural Board of Education, and also two special education schools.

Transportation

Railway
 JR East - Jōetsu Line
  -  - 
 JR East -  Tadami Line
  -  -  -  -  -  -  -  -

Highway
  Kan-Etsu Expressway

Local attractions

Places of interest / sights 
 Okutadami Dam/ Okutadami lake (Official name: Kanayama lake)
  (/ Shiramine Ginzan)
 Eirin temple. Eirin and Saifuku temple hold beautiful sculptures from the Japanese Michelangelo, dating from the end of the Edo Era. Both temples have been designated cultural assets by Niigata prefecture
 
  · Sato family (Important cultural assets of the country)
 Ikeno Tōge - Ikeno Tōge and Kagamigaike are so close that there is a road station on the shores of Kagamigaike Pond.
 Kagamigaike - Neighboring Irihirose road station.
 Oze - It is one of the entrances of Niigata prefecture.
 Miya Hīragi Memorial Hall - Uonuma City Hall Adjacent to Horinouchi Government Office
  - adjoining Koide Township Cultural Center 
 Echigo Golf Club - Opened in September 1992 according to the third sector system by local governments (Niigata prefecture and former Hiroshima village) and 11 private companies based on the Okutadami Recreation Area Development Project in Niigata Prefecture. It applied for the civil rehabilitation law on January 13, 2006, and has effectively broken down, but it started again.
 Stars' house - Astronomical observation facility located at the summit of Suhara ski resort. There is a celestial observation dome equipped with a 400 mm reflective telescope.
 
 Shimizu Kawabe Shrine
 Hayatsu Gallery
 Echigo Herbal Garden Irihirose
 General Park Koide Park
 General Park Tsukioka Park
 Hirokami Nature Park
 Horinouchi Yana field
 Hirokami yana place
 Asakusa Sanroku Ecology Museum
 Noyama no Kō House of documents
 Yunotani cultural exchange center Yubio
 The village of Kamiyu and the surroundings
 National Residence Asakusa Sanso
 Small Shirosawa Hut · Oku Ginzan Campground
Etc.

Onsen 
 
 Ginzantaira Onsen, Hot Springs from the snowfalls
 Toshikazu Onsen, New Asakusadake Onsen
 Kusushi Onsen 
 Nakanosawa Onsen - Hanekawa manor
 Sumon Onsen Seiun house
 Komami viewing Onsen

Ski resorts 
 
 
 
 
 
 
In addition to this, the Echigo Axiom ski resort (Formerly named Gongendō ski resort) in the old SUmon village, Nakame Ski resort in the former Ichirose village was open but both have been closed.

Festivals / events 

 Dai no Ban Bon Odori Osaka (Horinouchi area designated as an important intangible folk cultural property on December 16, 1998)
 Shineri Benten Tataki Jizo Festival (Kojima district June 30 every year), where as a guy you can pinch the women in a special place. If they reply by a tap on your shoulder, you will have good fortune this year! 
 Ushi no kakutsuki no Shuuzoku:  (However  designated important intangible folk cultural property by Dai Imogawa area On 22 May 1978, it is nowadays suspended because it involved bull fights)
 Uonuma "Fureai Summer Snow Festival" (Ginzandaira District, every Last Friday and Sunday of July)
 Koide festival (Koide area every August from 25th to 27th)
 Horinouchi Juugoya Matsuri, where the full moon is celebrated (Horinouchi area, every second weekend of September: Friday, Saturday, Sunday. It was formerly held from September 14 to 16)
 
 Snow Flower Water Festival (Horinouchi Area February 11 of every year)
 At the same time, 'Hatto Festival' will be held.
 Sumeragi Ōichi (Horinouchi area, on every first Sunday of May to October)
 Oze Saburo Chuunagon Kuyō Matsuri
 Yunosato snow festival "108 Lights" - first Sunday of March every year
 Torioi: Procession held at New Year's (January 14 every year)
 God of the age (January 15 every year)
 Shioritōge Hill Climb in Yunotani
Etc.

Traditional crafts 
Osawa Washi : Traditional Japanese paper (former Yunotani village)

Notable people from Uonuma
Ken Watanabe, actor in many Japanese and American productions.
Ryuichi Yoneyama, Governor of Niigata Prefecture
Sato Anju, Former Member of NGT48

References

External links

Official Website 
Uonuma Tourist Association 

Cities in Niigata Prefecture
Uonuma, Niigata